Gasperini may refer to:

Gian Piero Gasperini, Italian football player and coach
Giovanni Gasperini, Italian gymnast
A commune in Pecetto di Valenza

See also
Gasperini v. Center for Humanities (1996), a US Supreme Court case 

Italian-language surnames